A. P. C. Veerbahu was an Indian politician and former Member of the Legislative Assembly. He was elected to the Tamil Nadu legislative assembly as an Indian National Congress candidate from Srivaikuntam constituency in 1957 and 1962 elections.

References 

Indian National Congress politicians from Tamil Nadu
Living people
Year of birth missing (living people)
Madras MLAs 1957–1962
Madras MLAs 1962–1967